Max-like protein X is a protein that in humans is encoded by the MLX gene.

Function 

The product of this gene belongs to the family of basic helix-loop-helix leucine zipper (bHLH-Zip) transcription factors. These factors form heterodimers with Mad proteins and play a role in proliferation, determination and differentiation. This gene product may act to diversify Mad family function by its restricted association with a subset of the Mad family of transcriptional repressors, namely Mad1 and Mad4. Alternatively spliced transcript variants encoding different isoforms have been identified for this gene.

Interactions 

MLX (gene) has been shown to interact with MNT, MXD1 and MLXIPL.

MLX must dimerize with MondoA or with MLXIPL (carbohydrate-responsive element-binding protein)  to regulate target genes.

References

Further reading

External links 
 

Transcription factors